Setsuri may refer to:
 
 Setsuri, a new religious movement better known as Providence (religion)
Setsuri River, a river in Japan

See also
 Setsuri Tsuzuki, a manga artist, see Broken Angels and Calling You